Vergt is a commune in the Dordogne department in Nouvelle-Aquitaine in southwestern France.

History
On 9 October 1562, Vergt was the site of one of the first major battles of the French Wars of Religion. An army of Huguenot rebels under Symphorien de Duras was defeated by a Royalist force led by Blaise de Montluc, a victory which prevented them linking up with Protestant forces north of the Loire.

Population

See also
Communes of the Dordogne department

References

Sources
 

Communes of Dordogne